NGC 481 is an elliptical galaxy in the constellation Cetus. It is located approximately 229 million light-years from Earth and was discovered on November 20, 1886 by astronomer Lewis A. Swift.

See also  
 List of galaxies 
 List of NGC objects (1–1000)

References

External links 
 
 
 SEDS

Lenticular galaxies
0481
4899
Astronomical objects discovered in 1886
Discoveries by Lewis Swift
Cetus (constellation)